Igor Radin (1 May 1938 – 20 September 2014) was a Yugoslav ice hockey player. He competed in the men's tournament at the 1964 Winter Olympics. He was also a rower, and took part in the Coxed Four event at the 1960 Summer Olympics.

See also
List of athletes who competed in both the Summer and Winter Olympic games

References

External links
 

1938 births
2014 deaths
Ice hockey players at the 1964 Winter Olympics
Olympic ice hockey players of Yugoslavia
Sportspeople from Novi Sad
Rowers at the 1960 Summer Olympics
Olympic rowers of Yugoslavia
Slovenian ice hockey defencemen
Yugoslav ice hockey defencemen
Slovenian male rowers
Yugoslav male rowers
HDD Olimpija Ljubljana players
Sportspeople from Ljubljana